Samuel Watson Smith (August 21, 1897, Cincinnati, Ohio – July 29, 1993, Tucson, Arizona) was an American archaeologist and researcher on the indigenous cultures and artifacts of the western Anasazi area.

Biography
Watson Smith matriculated in 1915 at Brown University and graduated there in 1919 with a bachelor's degree after a brief interruption for military service in WW I. After working for some time, he entered Harvard Law School and graduated there in 1924. He then worked for a law firm in Providence, Rhode Island until 1930, when his parents died. From 1930 to 1933 he worked on settling his parents' estates and by inheritance became independently wealthy. In the summer of 1933 he did archaeological field work at Colorado's Lowry Pueblo  with Paul Sidney Martin of the Field Museum of Natural History. After studying law, anthropology, and history during the winter of 1934–1935 under the direction of Max Radin at the University of California, Berkeley, Smith became committed to a career in archaeology. In the spring of 1935 he joined Ansel Hall's Rainbow Bridge-Monument Valley Expedition in the Kayenta area and also spent the early summers of 1936 and 1937 as a member of the Expedition. During this time, Smith met George Walter Brainerd, Edward Twitchell Hall, and John Beach Rinaldo. In the autumn of 1935, Lyndon Lane Hargrave invited Smith to work at the Museum of Northern Arizona with him and Harold Sellers Colton in the preparation of the Handbook of Northern Arizona Pottery Types, which was published in 1937.

In the summer of 1936, Smith joined the Awatovi Expedition, led by John Otis Brew. Smith's arrival happened to coincide with the discovery of a kiva with extensive painted murals. He was assigned the task of exposing these "remarkable artistic and religious records." This work eventually led to his becoming a leading expert on "ceramic classification, murals, Pueblo ethnology and Zuni law."

In 1949 and 1951 he directed the Peabody Museum's excavations in New Mexico's Quemado area, which is on the boundary of two cultures: Anasazi and Mogollon. In 1951 he, with John Milton Roberts, began a study of Zuni law. Zuni elders and an interpreter enabled Smith and Roberts to compile a unique corpus of Zuni law, which they published in 1954. During his long career, he published many scholarly articles, essays, reviews, and forewords. In 1992 he published a 93-page article on his archaeological career.

Selected publications
 
 
 
 with John Milton Roberts: 
 with Richard B. Woodbury and Nathalie F. S. Woodbury:

References

External links
 

1897 births
1993 deaths
20th-century American archaeologists
Brown University alumni
Harvard Law School alumni